The dye Ethyl Green (C.I. 42590; C27H35BrClN3) is a triarylmethane dye.  It is soluble in water.

Ethyl green is made of crystal violet by adding an ethyl group; crystal violet is therefore a possible contaminant.

Methyl green is a closely related dye used as a stain in histology.  Ethyl green is also used as a histological dye.

External links
Chemical data

References

Triarylmethane dyes
Staining dyes
Anilines
Quaternary ammonium compounds